Saraiki, Siraiki or Seraiki may refer to:

Relating to Pakistan
 Saraiki language, an Indo-Aryan language of central Pakistan
 Saraiki people, an ethnolinguistic group of central Pakistan 
 Siraiki, also known as Siroli, a dialect of the Sindhi language

Places
 , a village in Vorotynsky District, Russia
 , a village in Pāvilosta Municipality, Latvia
 Siraki, a village in Iran

See also
Saraik, a district in Afghanistan
 Saraiki culture, the culture of the Saraiki people of Pakistan
 Saraiki diaspora, Saraiki people of Pakistan dispersed around the world
 Saraiki literature, the literature of Saraiki people of Pakistan
 Saraiki music, music of Saraiki people of Pakistan
 Saraikistan, a geographical region and a proposed province in Pakistan

Language and nationality disambiguation pages